Lee Rourke (born 1972) is an English writer and literary critic. His books include the short story collection Everyday, the novels The Canal (winner of The Guardian’s Not The Booker Prize in 2010), Vulgar Things, and Glitch, and the poetry collections Varroa Destructor and Vantablack.

Career
Rourke is a contributing editor at 3:AM Magazine, has a literary column at the New Humanist, and has written regularly for The Guardian, The Times Literary Supplement, Bookforum, The Independent, and the New Statesman.

From 2012 to 2014, he was Writer-in-Residence at Kingston University, where he later lectured in the MFA Programme in creative writing and critical theory. After leaving Kingston University, he taught creative writing at the University of East London and Middlesex University. He currently lives in Leigh-on-Sea, England.

Work

Novels

 Glitch - an unflinching study of grief.

 Vulgar Things - part mystery, part romance, part odyssey novel.

 The Canal - boredom, technology, violence.

Short stories

Everyday is a set of short stories based in the heart of London.

Poetry

Rourke has published two poetry collections: Varroa Destructor, published in 2013 by 3:AM Press, and Vantablack, published in 2020 by Dostoevsky Wannabe.

Anthologies

Rourke's work has appeared in a number of anthologies, including
Best British Short Stories 2011 (ed. Nicholas Royle, Salt Publishing, 2011),
Best European Fiction (ed. Aleksandar Hemon, Dalkey Archive Press, 2011) and
The Beat Anthology (ed. by Sean McGahey, Blackheath Books, 2010).

Non-Fiction

A Brief History of Fables: From Aesop to Flash Fiction is published by Hesperus Press.

Trying To Fit A Number To A Name: The Essex Estuary Lee Rourke (author), Tim Burrows (author) is published by Influx Press.

Themes

Boredom

Rourke's fiction deals primarily with boredom. Rourke explains further in The Guardian:

"Boredom has always fascinated me. I suppose it is the Heideggerian sense of 'profound boredom' that intrigues me the most. What he called a 'muffling fog' that swathes everything – including boredom itself – in apathy. Revealing 'being as a whole': that moment when we realise everything is truly meaningless, when everything is pared down and all we are confronted with is a prolonged, agonising nothingness. Obviously, we cannot handle this conclusion; it suspends us in constant dread. In my fictions I am concerned with two archetypes only, both of them suspended in this same dread: those who embrace boredom and those who try to fight it. The quotidian tension, the violence that this suspension and friction creates naturally filters itself into my work."

Glitch

Rourke's most recent work deals with the notion of Glitch Aesthetics in relation to art and death. Rourke explains further in Vol 1 Brooklyn:

"The world around us and the books we read, the films we watch, the art we gaze at, there’s always a flaw. We spend so much time trying to hide these fissures, we try to patch them up as best we can, covering up the cracks as best we can, and it has become the default mode to try and mimic perfection with this constant hiding and covering of what truly lies beneath the surface of things."

"There are a number of artists and writers and thinkers who’ve thought differently over the years and have tried to reveal the beauty in these mistakes, turning what most people believe to be ugly into art: Andy Warhol, Samuel Beckett, Ann Quin, Béla Tarr, et al. It’s the same with illness, with dying and death, there doesn’t seem to be an acceptance of this fundamental flaw, we hide from it, cover it up, pretend it isn’t happening. But there’s beauty even in death. I remember when my mother was dying of throat cancer, there was still part of me that couldn’t accept it, that tried to convince myself that she would somehow get better. Call this a coping mechanism, the simple fact that I didn’t want my mother to die, hope, whatever you want. The simple fact was I couldn’t meet it head on like my mother did. I think back to that time now and my mother said some of the most beautiful things to me and my dad and my brother. She looked at the world differently, we talked and talked and talked while she lay in bed dying, and we sat beside her, it was truly beautiful. I see that now, but back then, I tried to hide it looking for perfection – worried that others’ would not want to see these moments. Everything is glitched, and there’s immense beauty to be found in these mistakes. So we must accept them."

References

External links 
  Lee Rourke Homepage
 Lee Rourke reads from The Canal on the InDigest podcast

Living people
21st-century British novelists
1972 births
Writers from London
British male novelists
21st-century English male writers